John Daszak is a British operatic tenor. He made his debut with the Royal Opera in 1996, and has performed widely in Europe.

Daszak's father was Ukrainian, and his mother British.

Daszak trained at the Guildhall School of Music and Drama, the Royal Northern College of Music and the Accademia d’Arte Lirica, Osimo, Italy.

References

English operatic tenors
Living people
20th-century British male opera singers
21st-century British male opera singers
British people of Ukrainian descent
Year of birth missing (living people)
Place of birth missing (living people)
Alumni of the Guildhall School of Music and Drama
Alumni of the Royal Northern College of Music